Julian Gerxho (born 21 January 1985 in Fier) is an Albanian retired football player who played amongst others for Dinamo Tirana in the Albanian First Division as a striker.

Club career

Tërbuni Pukë
On 17 July 2015, Gërxho signed with the newly promoted club Tërbuni Pukë for an undisclosed fee, and was allocated squad number 20 for the upcoming 2015–16 season. In Tërbuni's first ever Albanian Superliga match against Tirana, Gërxho played as a starter but was substituted in the 73rd minute for Tusha in an eventual 1–2 home loss.

Dinamo Tirana
On 20 January 2016, Gërxho left Tërbuni and joined Albanian First Division side as well as the second-most successful club in Albania Dinamo Tirana until the end of the season. He was assigned the vacant number 10 and made his Dinamo Tirana debut on 13 February in a 1–0 away defeat to Butrinti Sarandë.

Honours
Bylis Ballsh

Albanian Cup: Runner-up 2012–13

References

External links
 

1985 births
Living people
Sportspeople from Fier
Albanian footballers
Association football forwards
KF Apolonia Fier players
KF Elbasani players
KS Shkumbini Peqin players
KF Bylis Ballsh players
KF Tërbuni Pukë players
FK Dinamo Tirana players
KS Turbina Cërrik players
Kategoria Superiore players
Kategoria e Parë players